The 2013 Women's Premier Soccer League season is the 17th season of the WPSL.

Standings
As of 7/14/13

Big Sky Conference

North Division

South Division

Northeast Atlantic Conference

New England Division

Mid-Atlantic Division

Tri-State Division

South Atlantic Division

Midwest Conference

FC St. Louis dropped out of competition after scheduling but before the season started, forfeiting all of its matches as 3-0 wins for the opposing teams.

Northwest Conference

Washington Division

Oregon Division

Pacific Conference

North Division

South Division

Southeast Conference

Sunshine Conference

Playoffs

West Region

Northwest bracket

West bracket

Central Region

Midwest bracket

Central region final

East Region

South Region

Southeast bracket

Sunshine bracket

South region final

National Championship

Composite top 16 bracket

References

Women's Premier Soccer League seasons
United States Adult Soccer Association leagues
2